Trachys minutus is a species of jewel beetles belonging to the family Buprestidae.

Description
Trachys minutus is a beetle of the small size reaching a length of  3 to 3.5 millimeters. It is dark colored, shiny and slightly hairy. The female lays eggs on the leaves of deciduous trees, especially elm (Ulmus). The larvae eat the green tissue between the upper and lower layer of the leaves, making cavities called mines.

Distribution
This species is present in most of Europe, the eastern Palearctic realm, and the Near East.

Subspecies
Trachys minutus minutus (Linnaeus, 1758)
Trachys minutus salicis (Lewis, 1893)

External links

 Biolib

Buprestidae
Beetles of Europe
Beetles described in 1758
Taxa named by Carl Linnaeus